The Hudson River Region AVA is an American Viticultural Area around the Hudson River in eastern New York.  The region is home to the oldest continuously operating winery in North America, the Brotherhood Winery, established in  1839.  The oldest continuously cultivated vineyard in North America is also located in the Hudson River Region AVA, and is today operated by Benmarl Winery.

Most vineyards in the region are located within  of the river.  The Hudson River flows from north to south, and most vineyards are planted on hills on the western side of the river, where early morning sunshine can rapidly warm the vines.  Ocean breezes channeled north up the river help to moderate the climate in the region, making it cooler in the summer and warmer in the winter than surrounding areas. The hardiness zone ranges from 7a to 6a.

The most important grape varieties in the area are French hybrids and cool-climate Vitis vinifera varieties.

References

External links
 Survey of Hudson Valley Wine and Winemaking

American Viticultural Areas
Hudson Valley
New York (state) wine
1982 establishments in New York (state)